Three Windows is an album by American jazz group the Modern Jazz Quartet featuring performances recorded with the New York Chamber Symphony in 1987 and released on the Atlantic label.

Reception
The Allmusic review stated "Nice music overall although this is not one of the most essential MJQ releases".

Track listing
All compositions by John Lewis
 "Three Windows" - 8:13
 "Kansas City Breaks" - 6:29
 "Encounter in Cagnes" - 12:28
 "Django" - 7:54    
 "A Day in Dubrovnik" - 16:34

Personnel
Milt Jackson - vibraphone
John Lewis - piano
Percy Heath - bass
Connie Kay - drums, percussion 
New York Chamber Symphony conducted by John Lewis

References

Atlantic Records albums
Modern Jazz Quartet albums
1987 albums
Albums produced by Nesuhi Ertegun
Orchestral jazz albums